George Maximilian Bethune (1854 – 1942) was an English cricketer who played for Hampshire during leaves from his occupation of managing sugar plantations in what was then British Guiana.

Cricketing career
In 1886 and 1887 Hampshire played him as a batsman, with very limited success. In 1889 he was first used as a bowler, delivering 11 maidens out of 23 overs in his first match and taking 4 wickets for only 25 runs. Thereafter his place was owed to his highly economical bowling, which resulted over his brief career in 44% of his overs being maidens.

His first cousin Henry Beauclerk Bethune also played for Hampshire.

Life
He was the son of the Reverend George Cuddington Bethune (1807-1898), at the time rector of Worth, Sussex, and his wife Julia (1822-1915), daughter of the Reverend George Hole, rector of Chulmleigh and grandson of George Horne, and his wife Jane, daughter of Robert Hawgood Crew. 

He made his career in the sugar industry of British Guiana, becoming manager of the major estate of Enmore.

In 1890 he married Elizabeth de Burgh (1861-1930), daughter of Michael Rowland O'Maley, manager of the Colonial Bank (since part of Barclays) in Georgetown, and his first wife Julia Adriana, daughter of Major Jacob Heitmann Gyllich, Knight of the Dannebrog and grand-daughter of Frederik Christian von Meley. They had seven children.

His third son, Edward Charles O'Maley Bethune (1900-1985), was also a cricketer, playing for Felsted School.

References

1854 births
1942 deaths
English cricketers
Hampshire cricketers
People from Bersted